Mậu A is a town and the capital of the Văn Yên District of Yên Bái Province, in the northeastern region of Vietnam.

References

Populated places in Yên Bái province
District capitals in Vietnam
Townships in Vietnam